= John Welsh (quarterback) =

Former American football quarterback

Profile
- Position: Quarterback

Career information
- College: Idaho (1998–2001)

John Welsh (born c 1980) is a former American football quarterback. He played for the Idaho Vandals from 1998 to 2001. As a junior in 2000, he ranked among the leading quarterbacks in major-college football with a 62.9% pass completion percentage (4th), 288.3 yards gained per game played (6th), 3,171 passing yards (8th), 3,199 total yards (8th), 22 passing touchdowns (10th), and 17 interceptions (5th). Over four years at Idaho, he completed 584 of 968 passes (60.3%) for 7,401 yards, 55 touchdowns, 38 interceptions, and a 135.5 passer rating.
